Haftvaneh (also Romanized as Haftvāneh) is a village in Akhtachi-ye Gharbi Rural District, in the Central District of Mahabad County, West Azerbaijan Province, Iran. At the 2006 census, its population was 46, in 7 families.

References 

Populated places in Mahabad County